Shriswara (born Shriswara), also known as Shriswara, is an Indian actress from Mumbai who mainly works in Hindi films & television shows. She is best-known for her performances in films like D-Day, Singham Returns, Baaghi 3 etc.

Filmography

Films

Television

Web series

Recognition
 2014 - Nominated - Screen Weekly Awards - "Most Promising Newcomer - Female" - for her role Nafisa in D-Day.

References

External links

Indian film actresses
Indian television actresses
Indian web series actresses
Actresses from Mumbai
Actresses in Hindi cinema
Actresses in Hindi television
21st-century Indian actresses